Linji Yixuan (Rinzai Gigen; died 866 CE) was the founder of the Linji school of Chan Buddhism during Tang Dynasty China.

Línjì yǔlù

Information on Linji is based on the Línjì yǔlù (臨濟語錄; Japanese: Rinzai-goroku), the Record of Linji. The standard form of these sayings was not completed until 250 years after Linji's death and likely reflect the teaching of Chán in the Linji school at the beginning of the Song Dynasty rather than those of Linji's in particular.

This  contains stories of his interactions with teachers, contemporaries, and students. The recorded lectures are a mixture of the conventional and the iconoclastic. Those who resented the iconoclasm saw Linji as “one of the most infamous Chinese Chan masters who censored traditional Buddhist practices and doctrines.”  Despite the iconoclasm, however, the Línjì yǔlù reflects a thorough knowledge of the sutras. Linji's teaching-style, as recorded in the Línjì yǔlù, exemplifies Chán development in the Hongzhou school of Mazu and his successors, such as Huangbo, Linji's master.

Biography
According to the Línjì yǔlù, Linji was born into a family named Xing in Caozhou (modern Heze in Shandong), which he left at a young age to study Buddhism in many places.

Also according to the Línjì yǔlù, Linji was trained by the Chan master Huángbò Xīyùn, but attained kensho while discussing Huángbò's teaching during a conversation with the reclusive monk Dàyú. Linji then returned to Huángbò to continue his training after awakening. In 851 CE, Linji moved to the Linji temple in Hebei, where he took his name, which also became the name for the lineage of his form of Chán Buddhism.

Teaching style

Iconoclasm
Linji is reputed for being iconoclastic, leading students to awakening by hitting and shouting.

Three Mysterious Gates
Chán faced the challenge of expressing its teachings of "suchness" without getting stuck into words or concepts. The alleged use of shouting and beating was instrumental in this non-conceptual expression—after the students were well-educated in the Buddhist tradition.

Linji is described as using The Three Mysterious Gates to maintain the Chán emphasis on the nonconceptual nature of reality, while employing sutras and teachings to instruct his students:
 The First Gate is the "mystery in the essence", the use of Buddhist philosophy, such as Huayan, to explain the interpenetration of all phenomena.
 The Second Gate is the "mystery in the word", using the Hua Tou for "the process of gradually disentangling the students from the conceptual workings of the mind".
 The Third Gate is the "mystery in the mystery", "involving completely nonconceptual expressions such as striking or shouting, which are intended to remove all of the defects implicit in conceptual understanding".

References in popular culture
The titular story of Volume 2 of Kazuo Koike & Goseki Kojima's manga comic Lone Wolf and Cub revolves around Linji's saying "if you meet a buddha, kill the buddha," in which the protagonist must overcome his self to assassinate a living buddha.

In the manga Gensōmaden Saiyūki by Kazuya Minekura, Genjō Sanzō purports to live by the concept of "無一物 (muichimotsu)," as taught by his teacher Sanzō Kōmyō, who is quoted as saying:

Lineage

See also
 Buddhism in China
 Dharma Drum Retreat Center Chán Buddhism retreat center founded by Ch'an master Sheng-yen
 List of Rinzai Buddhists

Notes

References

Written references

Web-references

Sources

 
 Keown, Damien. A Dictionary of Buddhism. Oxford: Oxford University Press, 2003. 
 Kazuo Koike and Goseki Kojima. "Lone Wolf and Cub 2: The Gateless Barrier". Dark Horse, 2000. , 
 Lowenstein, Tom. The Vision of the Buddha: Buddhism – The Path to Spiritual Enlightenment. 
 
 
 Schloegl, Irmgard. The Zen Teaching of Rinzai. Shambhala Publications, Inc., Berkeley, 1976.

Further reading
 Ruth Fuller Sasaki, The Record of Linji

External links

 Taisho Tripitaka Vol. 47, No. 1985 The Chinese Buddhist Electronic Text Association online Chinese character text of The Record of Linji (臨濟録 Linji Lu)
 Japanese translation of Linji
 The record of Linji. Translation by Ruth Fuller Sasaki, and introduction by Yanagida Seizan
 The Zen Teaching of Rinzai (a.k.a. The Record of Rinzai) Translation by Irmgard Schloegel PDF Text
 Albert Welter, The Textual History of the Linji lu (Record of Linji): The Earliest Recorded Fragments

9th-century Chinese philosophers
866 deaths
Chinese scholars of Buddhism
Tang dynasty Buddhists
Chan Buddhist monks
Tang dynasty philosophers
Rinzai Buddhists
Spiritual teachers
Chinese Zen Buddhists
Year of birth unknown
Philosophers from Shandong
People from Dongming County